Sport Club Flamengo, commonly known as Flamengo, were a Brazilian football team from Recife, Pernambuco state. They won the first edition of the Campeonato Pernambucano.

History
Sport Club Flamengo were founded on April 20, 1914, and they are one of the founders of the Pernambuco State Football Federation, thus they competed in the Campeonato Pernambucano's first edition, played in 1915. They won that competition after beating Torre Sport Club in the final game of the league's final stage. The club participated on the Campeonato Pernmabucano for the last time in 1947, and eventually folded sometime after.

Achievements

 Campeonato Pernambucano:
 Winners (1): 1915

References

Defunct football clubs in Pernambuco
Association football clubs established in 1914
1914 establishments in Brazil
Association football clubs disestablished in 1947
1947 disestablishments in Brazil